Charles Theodore "Tarzan" Cooper (August 30, 1907 – December 19, 1980) was an African American professional basketball player who is enshrined in the Naismith Memorial Basketball Hall of Fame. He is mostly known for his time with the all-Black professional New York Renaissance (1929–41).

Cooper was born in Newark, Delaware. After playing at Philadelphia Central High School, Cooper turned pro in 1925. He played for the Philadelphia Panthers and Philadelphia Saints until 1929 when he joined the New York Renaissance or Rens for eleven seasons. All were independent teams because the early professional leagues were all-white.

At 6 ft 4 in (193 cm), Cooper has been called the greatest center that ever played by Hall of Famer Joe Lapchick, center for the rival Original Celtics.

Cooper died at age 73 in Philadelphia, Pennsylvania.

External links
 "Charles T. Cooper" at the Basketball Hall of Fame.

1907 births
1980 deaths
African-American basketball players
New York Renaissance players
Naismith Memorial Basketball Hall of Fame inductees
Centers (basketball)
Basketball players from Delaware
American men's basketball players
People from Newark, Delaware
20th-century African-American sportspeople
Central High School (Philadelphia) alumni